The 2014–15 Eastern Counties Football League season (known as the 2014–15 Thurlow Nunn Eastern Counties Football League for sponsorship reasons) was the 73rd in the history of Eastern Counties Football League, a football competition in England.

Premier Division

After the promotion of Brightlingsea Regent to the Isthmian League, the resignation of Cambridge Regional College and the relegation of Woodbridge Town to Division One at the end of the previous season, the Premier Division remained at 20 clubs, and featured three new clubs all promoted from Division One:
Fakenham Town
Ipswich Wanderers
Whitton United

The following four clubs applied for promotion to Step 4: Godmanchester Rovers, Haverhill Rovers, Norwich United and Stanway Rovers. However, Norwich United, Godmanchester Rovers and Stanway Rovers all withdrew from the process, and with Haverhill Rovers outside the top three, it meant that no team would be promoted from the league for the first time since the 2007-08 season.

League table

Results

Stadia and Locations

Division One

After Whitton United, Fakenham Town and Ipswich Wanderers were promoted to the Premier Division at the end of the previous season, Division One remained at 19 clubs, and featured three new clubs:
King's Lynn Town reserves, promoted from the Peterborough and District League
Leiston reserves
Woodbridge Town, relegated from the Premier Division

League table

Results

Stadia and Locations

References

External links
 Eastern Counties Football League

2014-15
9